Route 371, also known as Millertown Junction Road, is a  north–south highway in central Newfoundland in the Canadian province of Newfoundland and Labrador. It is an entirely unsigned, narrow, gravel road for its entire length, serving as the only access road to the community of Millertown Junction, connecting with Route 370 (Buchans Highway) at the other end. It is believed by some that this road has been abandoned, even though this is clearly not the case. There are no other major intersections or communities along the entire length of Route 371.

Major intersections

References

371